New Forest is a local government district in Hampshire, England. Its council is based in Lyndhurst. The district covers most of the New Forest National Park, from which it takes its name.

The district was created on 1 April 1974, under the Local Government Act 1972, by the merger of the municipal borough of Lymington with New Forest Rural District and part of Ringwood and Fordingbridge Rural District.

With its population estimated at 179,753 in mid-2018, New Forest is one of the most populated districts in England not to be a unitary authority. It was recommended by the Banham Commission to become one in 1995, but this was vetoed by the government of the day.

Politics

Elections to the council are held every four years, with all of the 60 seats on the council being elected at each election. From the 1999 election, the Conservatives have had a majority on the council, following a period of No overall control between 1991 and 1995, then Liberal Democrat control from 1995 to 1999.

Following the 2019 election, and suspension of Cllr Barry Rickman from the Conservative Group, the make-up of the Council is as follows:

Parishes and settlements

Ashurst and Colbury
Beaulieu, Boldre, Bramshaw, Bransgore, Breamore, Brockenhurst, Burley
Copythorne
Damerham, Denny Lodge
East Boldre, Ellingham, Harbridge and Ibsley, Exbury and Lepe
Fawley, Fordingbridge
Godshill
Hale, Hordle, Hyde, Hythe and Dibden
Lymington, Lyndhurst
Marchwood, Martin, Milford-on-Sea, Minstead
Netley Marsh, New Milton
Ringwood, Rockbourne
Sandleheath, Sopley, Sway
Totton and Eling
Whitsbury, Woodgreen

Premises

The council is based at Appletree Court on Beaulieu Road in Lyndhurst. The oldest part of the building was originally a large house, which was purchased in 1954 to become the offices of the New Forest Rural District Council. The building has been substantially extended since becoming council offices.

References

 
Non-metropolitan districts of Hampshire
1974 establishments in England
States and territories established in 1974